The 2000 Barber Dodge Pro Series season was the fifteenth season of this racing series. The championship was won by Nilton Rossoni. Ryan Hunter-Reay won the Rookie of the Year title. This was the first season the series raced outside of the United States. The Barber Dodge Pro Series supported the CART World Series at the Molson Indy Vancouver

Drivers
All drivers use Dodge-powered, Michelin-shod Reynard 98E chassis.

Race calendar and results

Final standings

 (R) indicates rookie driver

References

2000 in American motorsport
Barber Dodge Pro Series